Guntur railway station (station code:GNT) is an Indian Railways station in Guntur of Andhra Pradesh. It is situated on the Krishna Canal–Guntur section of Guntur railway division in the South central railway zone.

History 
The first rail lines in Guntur are of metre-gauge line opened Guntur–Repalle section in year 1916 and later between Guntur and Hubli/Goa.Later a broad-gauge rail line was built between GNT/VJA towards Howrah with the completion of Prakasam Barrage on River Krishna. By the end of the 20th century Guntur had 4 different railway lines passing through its junction.That railway lines is Guntur–Tenali section, Guntur–Vijayawada section, Guntur–Nallapadu-Guntakal section, Guntur–Nallapadu–Pagidipalli section.

Structure and amenities 
Guntur railway station has seven platforms and two entrances, namely the East and the West. These platforms are interconnected by subway system. The station is equipped with facilities, such as dormitories, parcel office, retiring rooms, drinking water, booking counters, refreshment stalls, separate pathways for public, rampways for disabled people, parking zone for car and auto rickshaws etc. Railways has formulated a plan to make station passenger friendly.A guidance system has been put in place in the station in which entry and exit points were numbered and major landmarks of the city have been displayed in foot-over-bridges. On average the station handles 43000 passengers daily and to facilitate easy movement multiple entry and exit gates are on both sides. The main entrance located at Railpet side is known as Guntur Government Hospital gate, and leads to platform 1.This entrance has been also named as terminal 1 and has gate numbers 1 to 7. The entrance on rear side is also known as Arundalpet side and has been named as terminal 2.Work is in progress for extension of platform no.8 and 9, to accommodate new trains at the railway station. In addition directional boards on the station premises helps in guidance of passengers.

Originating express trains

Halting trains

Facilities and Charges 

To book a retiring room, one must hold a confirmed ticket. This includes RAC tickets. The retiring room can only be booked at either the originating station or destination station of the ticket, subject to the availability of retiring rooms at the station. The retiring rooms can be booked for a maximum duration of 48 hours. The booking can be made using the PNR at rr.irctctourism.com.

Classification 

Guntur Junction railway station is an A–category station. It is recognized as a Model station, Adarsh station and Touch & Feel (Modern Stations) in the Guntur railway division.

Performance and earnings 

, the station served thousands of commuting population by a total of 33 trains, of which 7 are MEMU and local trains.

See also 
 List of railway stations in India

References 

Transport in Guntur
Railway stations in Guntur railway division
Railway junction stations in Andhra Pradesh
Railway stations in Guntur district
Railway stations opened in 1916
Buildings and structures in Guntur